The Tyrol S-Bahn provides regional rail services in metropolitan Innsbruck, Austria and its hinterlands in the state of Tyrol. At present, it is only a nominally an S-Bahn in that it only operates on the lines of the Austrian Federal Railways. Expansion projects, including new stations, however, are being planned.

Current lines 
 
Six lines have been operating since the timetable change on 13 December 2009.

and  "Inntal (Inn valley) S-Bahn" 
Line  S1 runs along the Inn valley on the Arlberg- and the Lower Inn Valley railway between Ötztal and Kufstein at 60-minute intervals. Almost all trains continue as regional trains to Rosenheim in Germany. Line S2 runs between Telfs-Pfaffenhofen and Fritzens-Wattens, with the combined service providing a 30-minute frequency.

and  "Wipptal-S-Bahn" 
Line S3 runs from Hall in Tirol on the lower Inn to Steinach am Brenner (station named Steinach in Tirol) and Brenner lines through the Wipptal (Wipp valley) south of Innsbruck. Line S4 runs between Brenner and  Innsbruck central station or Völs with some continuing to Fritzens-Wattens instead. Services operate at 60-minute frequencies, so the combined service between Innsbruck and Steinach operates at 30-minute intervals, and between Innsbruck and Hall trains operating as S1, S2, S3, REX (regional express), provide a service every 15-minute during the day.

Since the timetable change on 13 December 2009 S5 replaced the existing Mittenwald railway regional services to Seefeld and Scharnitz, operating at 60-minute intervals. In addition services to Garmisch-Partenkirchen and Munich in Germany now operates as REX, usual at a 120-minute frequency.

Also since 13 December 2009 regional trains on the Salzburg-Tirol line between Hochfilzen and Wörgl are replaced by an S6 service. This is currently operated by a single train between Saalfelden, Wörgl, Innsbruck and Brenner.

Regional express services 
The S-Bahn run on lines also used by REX trains. These generally operate at 120-minute intervals, except for trains towards Salzburg. Additional REX trains arrive operate in the peak hours.

History
The first S-Bahn line commenced operation on 9 December 2007 between 6am and 10pm at 30-minute intervals along the Inn valley lines (Lower Inn Valley and Arlberg railways) with stops at Hall in Tirol, Rum, Innsbruck central station, Innsbruck West station, Vols, Kematen in Tirol, Zirl, Inzing, Hatting, Flaurling, Oberhofen im Inntal and Telfs-Pfaffenhofen. On 14 December 2008 the second line opened with services on the Brenner railway. Although S-Bahn logos were installed from the beginning at the stations, it was first shown on official rail maps in December 2008.

Expansion plans
With completion of the New Lower Inn line (due at the end of 2012) line S3 is expected to be extended to Wörgl and S2 to Jenbach. 
In the coming years, three new stations are planned in and around Innsbruck—Innsbruck Messe (exhibition ground), Innsbruck WIFI and Hall Logistikzone—and existing stations will be relocated at Allerheiligen and Hötting to more attractive points for traffic. The location of new stations is being investigated.

References

External links

S-Bahn in Austria
Transport in Innsbruck